In Ukraine, the State Language Protection Commissioner, informally Language Ombudsman is a state official in charge of the enforcement of the law of Ukraine "" (2019), as an element of derussification (minimization the influence of the Russian language in Ukraine) and increase the usage of the Ukrainian language, which is the only state language in the country.

Commissioner's duties 
Commissioner's tasks are defined as follows:

 protection of Ukrainian as the state language;
 protection of the right of Ukrainian citizens to receive information and services in the spheres of public life in the state language on the whole territory of Ukraine and removal of any obstacles and restrictions in using the state language.

In order to fulfill these tasks, the Commissioner:

 submits proposals to the Cabinet of Ministers concerning state language protection and its development and functioning on the whole territory of Ukraine, as well as unchallenged use of Ukrainian by Ukrainians living abroad;
 enforces the laws on the state language policy and dedicated programmes on comprehensive development and functioning of Ukrainian as the state language;
 deals with legal persons' complaints on action and failure to act of authorities, enterprises of all owbership models and other legal persons concerning state language legislation.

Office holders
2019: 
2020

See also
, Ukraine

References

Ukrainian language
Politics of Ukraine
Government of Ukraine